Christine Minier (born 1964 in Saint-Raphaël, Var) is a French singer.

In 1987 whilst working as a hairdresser, Christine Minier won the French National Final to represent France at the 1987 Eurovision Song Contest with the song "Les mots d'amour n'ont pas de dimanche". She received 44 points, placing France in 14th place. In spite of the poor result, Minier didn't regret anything and still considers Eurovision as a great experience.

References

1964 births
Living people
Eurovision Song Contest entrants for France
Eurovision Song Contest entrants of 1987
Minier, Christine
French hairdressers